The 1994 McNeese State Cowboys football team was an American football team that represented McNeese State University as a member of the Southland Conference (Southland) during the 1994 NCAA Division I-AA football season. In their fifth year under head coach Bobby Keasler, the team compiled an overall record of 10–3, with a mark of 5–1 in conference play, and finished second in the Southland. The Cowboys advanced to the Division I-AA playoffs and lost to Montana in the quarterfinals.

Schedule

Roster

References

McNeese State
McNeese Cowboys football seasons
McNeese State Cowboys football